Alexis Scott Davis is an American actress.  She is known for playing Nya in The First Purge and Toni Braxton in the 2016 Lifetime television film Toni Braxton: Unbreak My Heart. In 2017, she had a starring role in the short-lived CBS drama series Training Day. She currently plays Quiara in The L Word: Generation Q.

Early life 
Davis was born in Baltimore, Maryland, to a life coach mother and a real estate firm owner father. She attended Drexel University as a Dance and Physical Therapy major before she moved to New York City in 2013 and continued her studies at the New York Film Academy.

Career 
In 2015, Davis was cast as Toni Braxton in the Lifetime television movie Toni Braxton: Unbreak My Heart. After making her television debut with this role, she next co-starred in the single season of the CBS crime drama series Training Day.

In 2018, Davis made her big screen debut with starring roles in three films: the action film Superfly, the horror film The First Purge, and the legal drama Foster Boy. In 2018, Davis also played a leading role in the ABC pilot for the magic-mystery drama For Love, that not was picked up to series. The following year, she was cast in a recurring role in the Showtime drama series The L Word: Generation Q. In 2020, she was cast as Katey Sagal's title character's daughter in the ABC series Rebel. Later that year, she was cast in the film A Lot of Nothing directing by Mo McRae. She will next star in the Quibi comedy series The Now.

Personal life 
Davis married actor Mo McRae on July 21, 2019,  after less than a year of being engaged. They had an "unplugged" wedding to ensure that all of their guests were "present in the moment" as they shared personalized vows. The couple met on the set of The First Purge. They welcomed their first child, in July 2020.

Filmography

Film

Television

References

External links 
 

Living people
21st-century American actresses
Actresses from Maryland
African-American actresses
American film actresses
American television actresses
New York Film Academy alumni
21st-century African-American women
21st-century African-American people
Year of birth missing (living people)